The presidential transition of Barack Obama began when he won the United States presidential election on November 4, 2008, and became the president-elect. Obama was formally elected by the Electoral College on December 15, 2008. The results were certified by a joint session of Congress on January 8, 2009, and the transition ended when Obama was inaugurated at noon EST on January 20, 2009.

Organization of the transition

The Obama transition organization was called the Obama-Biden Transition Project. The transition team was convened during the height of the campaign, well before the outcome could be known, to begin making preparations for a potential administration. It was co-chaired by John Podesta, who was Bill Clinton's fourth and last White House Chief of Staff and the president/chief executive officer of the Center for American Progress, Valerie Jarrett, who is one of Obama's longest-serving advisers, and Pete Rouse, former Senate chief of staff for Tom Daschle who succeeded Rahm Emanuel as Obama's chief of staff.

On November 5, the General Services Administration declared that Obama was the "apparent winner", making him eligible to receive transition funding and other government services, and granting him access to their 2008 Presidential Transition Headquarters in Washington, D.C. Podesta estimated that the transition would employ approximately 450 people and have a budget of about $12 million: $5.2 million would be paid by the federal government and the remaining $6.8 million would be funded by private sources, with each contribution limited to $5,000. The transition project would not accept money from political action committees or federal lobbyists.

Transition team
On November 5, Obama announced his complete transition team, which was organized as a nonprofit tax-exempt organization under U.S. federal tax code 501(c)(4). The advisory board consisted of Carol Browner, William M. Daley, Christopher Edley, Michael Froman, Julius Genachowski, Donald Gips, Janet Napolitano, Federico Peña, Susan Rice, Sonal Shah, Mark Gitenstein and Ted Kaufman.

Members of the transition team's senior staff included:

Chris Lu – Executive Director
Dan Pfeiffer – Communications Director
Stephanie Cutter – Chief Spokesperson
Robert Gibbs - Press Secretary
Cassandra Butts – General Counsel
Jim Messina – Personnel Director
Patrick Gaspard – Associate Personnel Director
Christine A. Varney - Personnel Counsel
Melody Barnes – Co-Director of Agency Review
Lisa Brown – Co-Director of Agency Review
Phil Schiliro – Director of Congressional Relations
Michael Strautmanis – Director of Public Liaison and Intergovernmental Affairs
Katy Kale – Co-Director of Operations
Brad Kiley – Co-Director of Operations

Joshua Gotbaum and Michael Warren headed the transition team of the Treasury Department. In addition, Thomas Donilon and Wendy Sherman oversaw the transition of the State Department. Seth Harris oversaw the transition in all of the labor, education, and transportation agencies with Edward B. Montgomery leading the Labor Department agency review team, Mortimer Downey leading the Transportation Department agency review team, and Judith Sherman leading the Education Department agency review team. Finally, John P. White and Michele Flournoy led the transition of the Defense Department.

Activities as the president-elect

Bush administration
 

In mid-October, the George W. Bush administration convened a 14-member council to coordinate with and brief the winning campaign's transition team. The New York Times reported that White House Chief of Staff Joshua Bolten then planned to recruit his predecessor, Andrew Card, to oversee the activity.
On November 6, Obama received his first classified intelligence briefing from Director of National Intelligence John Michael McConnell and Central Intelligence Agency Director Michael Hayden.

President Bush invited Obama and his team to attend the 2008 G-20 Washington summit held between November 15 and 20 in order to introduce him to more than 20 world leaders who attended the event. However, Obama did not come, and his transition team instead sent former Republican Rep. Jim Leach and former Secretary of State Madeleine Albright to meet with the heads of state. Obama was expected to address a United Nations global warming summit in Poland in December or allow a representative such as Al Gore to present his policies.

On November 10, Obama traveled to the White House and met with President Bush to discuss transition issues while First Lady Laura Bush took his wife Michelle on a tour of the mansion. NBC News reported that Obama advanced his economic agenda with Bush, asking him to attempt to pass a stimulus package in a lame duck session of Congress before the inauguration. He also urged Bush to accelerate the disbursement of $25 billion in funds to bail out the automobile industry and expressed concern about additional Americans losing their homes as mortgage rates increase again.

The Bush administration reportedly went out of its way to make the transition as seamless as possible for the incoming administration, earning accolades from Obama staff members and outside experts alike. According to nearly all accounts, the Bush administration streamlined the process for new officials to obtain security clearances and planned training exercises for the incoming national security team, to ensure that they would be ready to face a possible crisis on the first day in office. Part of this enhanced cooperation is required by laws passed at the behest of the 9/11 Commission, while part is attributed to the difficulty that the Bush administration had with its own transition, which lasted only five weeks and was felt to have had a deleterious effect on Bush's ability to govern. "I'm not sure I've ever seen an outgoing administration work as hard at saying the right thing", said Stephen Hess of the Brookings Institution. "This is really quite memorable."

During the transition, the Bush Administration had many important matters to address, even as a lame duck president. There was an ongoing financial crisis, and this was the first presidential transition since the presidential transition of Richard Nixon to occur while the United States was at war.

Resignation from Senate offices
At the time of their election, President-elect Obama and Vice President-elect Joseph Biden were incumbent U.S. Senators from Illinois and Delaware respectively. In accordance with Article I, Section 6 of the United States Constitution, both were required to resign their respective Senate seats on or before January 20, 2009, in order to become President and Vice President.

Obama Senate transition

Obama resigned from the Senate effective November 16, 2008. Initially, it was thought that his replacement would be named by Illinois Governor Rod Blagojevich. Since the term for the seat expired in January 2011, it would come up for its normal election in 2010 with no special election necessary. Blagojevich was expected to name Obama's immediate successor in the Senate by January 3, 2009. However, on December 9, 2008, the status of Obama's succession in the Senate was cast in doubt after Blagojevich was arrested on federal corruption charges, which included allegedly attempting to sell the appointment. Although placed in federal custody and released on $4,500 bail, as long as he remained governor Blagojevich continued to have sole authority to make the appointment. Several Democrats, including Sen. Dick Durbin, asked the Illinois General Assembly to schedule a special election instead. 

Speaking through a surrogate, Obama called for Blagojevich's resignation on December 10. Had Blagojevich resigned or been removed from office before making the appointment, the duty would have fallen to Illinois Lt. Gov. Pat Quinn, who would succeed Blagojevich as governor. However, Illinois Senate president Emil Jones said that he would call the Senate back into session to write a law that would result in Obama's replacement being determined in a special election.

However, after the state legislature did not pass a law mandating a special election for the seat, on December 30, Blagojevich announced that he was appointing Roland Burris, a former Illinois Attorney General, Illinois Comptroller, and U.S. Treasury Department official, to the seat, citing his constitutional duty in the absence of a law requiring a special election.
Blagojevich, Burris, and Representative Bobby Rush urged the public to consider the qualifications of Burris as a public servant and not the scandals in which Blagojevich was embroiled.

However, the Senate Democrats released a statement in which they reaffirmed that they would refuse to seat anyone appointed to the seat by Blagojevich, as that individual would be an ineffective representative of Illinois because of "questions of impropriety."

Some members of the Congressional Black Caucus, including Rush, expressed their support for seating Burris, who would be the only African-American in the Senate; Rush compared a Senate rejection of Burris to a lynching.
However, President-elect Obama released a statement condemning the appointment and again calling on Blagojevich to resign.
In addition, the Illinois Secretary of State, Jesse White, reiterated that he would not certify any appointment made by Blagojevich, although at the time it was not clear whether this could prevent Burris from taking office. Furthermore, the Senate might not actually have been able to refuse to seat Burris, as he met all constitutional requirements for the office and was not involved in the Blagojevich corruption scandal (per the U.S. Supreme Court decision Powell v. McCormack).

On January 9, 2009, the Illinois Supreme Court ruled in the case Burris v. White that the appointment only required the signature of the governor to be valid, and not that of the Illinois Secretary of State, and that the state of Illinois is not required to use the Senate's recommended certification form, as it is only "recommended" under the Standing Rules of the United States Senate. The Court further remarked that "no explanation has been given as to how any rule of the Senate, whether it be formal or merely a matter of tradition, could supersede the authority to fill vacancies conferred on the states by the federal constitution". Following the ruling, White provided Burris with a certified copy of the appointment's registration, and Burris delivered that copy, that bears the State Seal, to the Secretary of the Senate. His credentials declared valid, Burris was finally sworn in on January 15, 2009, by outgoing President of the Senate Dick Cheney.

Biden Senate transition
Biden had indicated that he would remain in the Senate until he was sworn in as Vice President on January 20, 2009. Although he was sworn in for a seventh Senate term in early January 2009, he resigned from the seat on January 15, 2009, having served just over 36 years in the body. He was Delaware's longest-serving senator.

On November 24, 2008, Delaware Gov. Ruth Ann Minner announced that Ted Kaufman would serve as Biden's appointed replacement. Kaufman was sworn in on January 16, 2009. A special election was held in November 2010, which elected Democratic candidate Chris Coons.

During his abbreviated final term in the Senate, Biden went on a diplomatic fact-finding trip to Iraq, Afghanistan, and Pakistan, becoming the first Vice-President-elect to undertake such a mission before entering office.

Change.gov website
On November 5, 2008, the transition team launched change.gov, the official website of the transition.

The website included a blog and jobs page. It also had a section that allowed visitors to share stories or their visions for the country. Visitors were able to comment on issues important to them using the Citizen's Briefing Book. Individuals applying for work within the Obama administration via this site were required to go through intensive consumer and criminal background checks performed by the  ChoicePoint Corporation. The website used a Creative Commons license.

As part of their efforts towards transparency, on December 5 the transition team announced that "all policy documents from official meetings with outside organizations will be publicly available for review and discussion on Change.gov." After the inauguration, many of the functions of change.gov were transferred to a redesigned White House website.

Administration appointments 

Thirty-one of the appointments to the transition team had previously worked in the Clinton administration, including Podesta, chief of staff Rahm Emanuel, and Biden's chief of staff Ron Klain.

Announcements
Obama held near-daily press conferences as President-elect to announce his administration nominees to the public. He introduced the nominees and occasionally took questions from the press regarding issues such as economic difficulties and the War in Afghanistan.

The appointments of Lawrence Summers and Timothy F. Geithner to key economic positions were criticized, on grounds that they had been prominently involved in creating many of the conditions that led to the financial crisis of 2007–2008, so "failure is being rewarded". Summers was a leading advocate of the derivatives deregulation, together with Alan Greenspan and Robert Rubin, and during his transition to Secretary of the Treasury, the act that kept commercial banks out of Wall street, the Glass–Steagall Act, was repealed. Geithner instead was criticized for his failure to pay $34,000 in income taxes.

The appointment of Eric Holder for Attorney General raised concerns, due to his role in the last-minute pardon issued by Bill Clinton for fugitive financier Marc Rich.

During his first press conference as President-elect, on November 7, Obama remarked about former first lady Nancy Reagan holding seances in the White House, which gained widespread attention. Termed his "first gaffe," Obama called Mrs. Reagan later that evening to apologize for what his spokesperson said was a "careless and off-handed remark."
 Chief of Staff: Representative Rahm Emanuel of Illinois was selected by President-elect Obama on November 6, two days after the election.
Deputy Chiefs of Staff: Jim Messina, current director of personnel for the Obama Transition team and former chief of staff to Senator Max Baucus; and Mona Sutphen, a former career foreign service officer who worked for President Clinton's National Security Council.
 Senior Advisors to the President: Campaign strategist David Axelrod and Pete Rouse, who has been serving as Obama's Senate chief of staff.
 Senior Advisor and Assistant to the President for Intergovernmental Relations and Public Liaison: Valerie Jarrett, a lawyer who served as Chicago's planning commissioner and later was chairperson of the Chicago Transit Authority. In 1995, Jarrett left public service to join the Habitat Corporation, a Chicago real estate management company.
 Assistant to the President for Legislative Affairs: Phil Schiliro.
White House Counsel: Greg Craig.
Cabinet Secretary: Chris Lu, former legislative director of Obama's Senate office.
Staff Secretary: Lisa Brown, executive director of the American Constitution Society.
Press Secretary: Robert Gibbs, announced on November 22.
Communications Director: Ellen Moran.
Deputy Director of Communications: Dan Pfeiffer.
Chair of the White House Council on Environmental Quality: Nancy Sutley, a well-known member of the LGBT community, and Deputy Mayor of Los Angeles.
Deputy Director of White House Office of Health Reform: Jeanne Lambrew.
White House photographer: Pete Souza.

Cabinet and top advisors

There was one withdrawal, New Mexico Governor Bill Richardson, whom Obama had named Secretary of Commerce. Richardson's administration was, at the time, the subject of a federal corruption probe; while maintaining that his administration was responsible for no wrongdoing, he withdrew so as to prevent a lengthy confirmation process from hindering the work of the U.S. Department of Commerce. The position was filled by Gary Locke.

Obama named Tim Kaine as new chairman of the Democratic National Committee, replacing Howard Dean who has clashed with Obama and his advisors in the past. Kaine served concurrently as Governor of Virginia until his term ended in January 2010.

Obama named Aneesh Chopra for the new position of Chief Technology Officer of the United States, Vivek Kundra as Chief Information Officer and Jeffrey Zients Chief Performance Officer and deputy director for management of the Office of Management and Budget

Initial reaction to Obama's choice of Leon Panetta as CIA director was mixed, with some intelligence professionals expressing concern that Panetta lacked specific intelligence experience, and others such as former Congressman and co-chair of the Iraq Study Group Lee H. Hamilton praising the choice.

Domestic policy

Economic policy

Environment and energy

Foreign affairs and national security

Table

Emerging agenda

Obama's developing presidential agenda was divided into domestic and foreign policy issues. In most cases, this agenda involved addressing crises already underway. His principal strategic decisions concerned how quickly to move bills through Congress. Some of his advisors suggested moving quickly, as Franklin D. Roosevelt did in 1933, under the belief that a more moderate approach would waste valuable time early in his presidency, when his political capital will be strongest. Others suggested moving more slowly, as Bill Clinton did before his attempt to enact a national healthcare program, based on the notion that rapid change could quickly wear down any bipartisan consensus. He was expected, in any case, to issue a series of executive orders within days of his inauguration, including a reversal of Bush-era executive orders restricting funding to family planning (including abortion) services and stem-cell research. There was also a possibility that a new cabinet level advisory post would be created overseeing the Department of Energy, Department of the Interior and the Environmental Protection Agency.

According to Podesta, the transition team planned to conduct an exhaustive review of Bush's executive orders in an effort to find quick changes that could be implemented on the first day in office. Podesta also says that there is a great deal that can be accomplished without waiting for Congress to act and that Obama wanted to move quickly once in office to restore "a sense that the country is working on behalf of the common good."

Economic agenda

The economic agenda under development initially focused on short-term measures intended to hold off widespread economic losses so that a longer-term economic agenda could then be formulated. That approach subsequently shifted to a longer-term stimulus plan, with a goal of creating 2.5 million jobs over a two-year period. With a cost of $700 to $800 billion, the stimulus plan would cost more than a quarter million dollars per job created (divide 750 billion by 2,500,000 yielding $300,000). In a nationally televised interview on December 7, he acknowledged that his agenda has changed over the past month, and that a short-term stimulus package had again become his first priority. He wanted to emphasize "shovel ready" infrastructure projects to create new jobs quickly. Barack Obama said he hoped to sign the stimulus package into law soon after taking office on January 20.

Obama's most immediate concern was an economic stimulus proposal that some Congressional Democrats had advocated. Like previous stimulus packages, that proposal was demand-side (Keynesian) in nature. It would likely consist of increased funding for unemployment benefits, the Food Stamp Program, and infrastructure projects, rather than tax rebates. In fact, Obama claimed to be planning "the largest infrastructure program in roads and bridges and other traditional infrastructure since the building of the Interstate Highway System in the 1950s." However, he also emphasized his plans to "green" the federal government by updating heating and lighting systems in federal buildings, as well as significant investment in technology initiatives such as mandatory electronic medical records, improved computers in schools, and universal availability of broadband Internet access.

Additional funding for Medicaid was also being considered. A similar stimulus bill was passed by the House of Representatives on September 26, 2008, but never approved by the Senate. Obama promised to promote a stimulus bill early in his presidency if one was not passed before his inauguration on January 20, 2009.
In addition, Obama considered the request of the U.S. automotive industry for a cash infusion of $50 billion in addition to the $25 billion that had already been approved, but emphasizing that his support is "conditioned on them making significant adjustments."

Obama also planned to push for a program to spend $150 billion over 10 years to develop new renewable energy sources. This money would also be used to encourage energy conservation and help the auto industry develop fuel-efficient vehicles. However, Mother Jones reported that the Windfall Profits Tax on oil companies, which he frequently cited during the campaign, had been dropped from the agenda early in the transition.

According to the transition's website, Obama also hoped to rekindle volunteerism by expanding AmeriCorps and the Peace Corps and also creating a new Classroom Corps. Other volunteer efforts reportedly include a Health Corps, Clean Energy Corps, and Veterans Corps. Middle and high school students would be asked to do 50 hours of community service work a year. College students would be eligible for $4,000 in tuition tax credits in exchange for community service work. Improved volunteerism programs aimed at senior citizens were projected, as well as augmented Youth Build and Head Start programs.

Agenda on healthcare
On December 5, Tom Daschle, who was designated to lead Obama's efforts for health care reform, announced a month-long campaign to solicit public input on the shape of that reform. People were encouraged to hold community meetings to discuss the issue, and to post their thoughts on www.change.gov, where over 10,000 comments had already been posted. Although Democratic leaders had met in private for several months to prepare a legislative package for unveiling in January, Daschle was anxious to avoid the appearance that the transition was working behind closed doors to create a sweeping agenda for change.

This technique, developed by grass roots organizations like MoveOn.org, was designed to reinforce the notion that Obama intended to aggressively pursue his health care reform agenda despite the worsening economy. "President-elect Obama has made health reform one of his top priorities, and I'm here to tell you that his commitment to changing the healthcare system remains strong and focused", said Daschle.

During a news conference on December 11, 2008, Obama linked health care reform to the upcoming economic stimulus package, noting that "It's not something that we can sort of put off because we're in an emergency." "This is part of the emergency." He expected the stimulus legislation to include a $40 billion increase in Medicaid spending over two years, plus a massive investment in health information management technology. Consideration was also being given to funding for retraining medical workers, expansion of the State Children's Health Insurance Program (SCHIP), and expansion of the COBRA provisions, which allow unemployed workers to purchase health insurance through their previous employer's plan.

Foreign policy agenda

One of the principal foreign policy issues that Obama ran on during the presidential campaign concerned his promise to withdraw most American troops from the Iraq War within sixteen months of his inauguration.
Another issue concerned the three areas of foreign policy that President Bush had been focusing on during the final months of his term: Iran's nuclear development, North Korea's nuclear arsenal, and the Israeli-Palestinian peace talks. In all three cases, a diplomatic structure had already been established, although some of the Bush Administration's goals might differ from those Obama would adopt as president.

In the Middle East, Bush began a new approach to the peace process, the so-called Annapolis process, which attempts to encourage Israeli and Palestinian leaders to agree on the outlines of a peace accord. Although both sides cite some success in these discussions, critics believe the talks have unduly ignored Hamas, which has been labeled as a terrorist organization, despite the fact that it holds an enormous amount of political power in the region.
Obama had not specified what his approach would be, although it was considered likely that he would appoint a high-level Middle East envoy, in part to free his Secretary of State so that other matters can also be addressed. Hamas expressed a willingness to talk to Obama, who has said that he will reciprocate only if it renounces terrorism, recognizes Israel's right to exist, and agrees to abide by past agreements. The Hamas leader in Gaza, Ismail Haniyeh, has said the Hamas government would accept a Palestinian state that followed the Green Line and would offer Israel a long-term truce if Israel recognises the Palestinians' national rights.

During his second term, Bush pursued an agreement with North Korea to end its nuclear weapons programs. To prevent a collapse in the process, Bush agreed to remove North Korea from the State Department's list of State Sponsors of Terrorism, which Obama supported. Obama has criticized Bush for taking so long to engage with North Korea, and has indicated that he would be eager to engage in a more proactive diplomatic effort to reach an agreement. A senior North Korean official recently told reporters that "we are ready to deal" with the incoming Obama administration.

Obama also deliberated on how to deal with Iran. Outgoing Secretary of State Condoleezza Rice had assembled a coalition of six states—the United Kingdom, France, Germany, Russia, China, and the United States—to confront Iran.
While the group won approval from the United Nations, Iran largely ignored its demands. While Obama had previously advocated carefully planned direct talks with Iran, he was now being seen as likely to build on the current coalition to broker an agreement with Iran.

In addition, Obama formulated a policy to deal with the U.S. missile defense shield that was under construction in Poland. He discussed the matter with both Polish President Lech Kaczyński and Russian President Dmitry Medvedev. While his advisors were working on a missile shield policy, his position at that time was simply that one might be deployed if and when it has been "proved to be workable".

Obama also planned to revoke a series of executive orders enacted by Bush that would have the effect of overturning a practice that many critics have labeled as torture against "detainees."

This would include requiring the CIA to abide by the Army Field Manual when interrogating prisoners. Resistance was expected, however, from some in the Intelligence Community, regarding the practicality of a complete revocation of these orders. He was also hoping to close the detention camp at Guantanamo Bay Naval Base in Cuba, although issues were expected to arise in such a plan because many of the detainees have been held without evidence or have been coerced in their confessions, which would not be admissible in a federal court.

A November 20, 2008, Los Angeles Times article stated, "Antiwar groups and other liberal activists are increasingly concerned at signs that Barack Obama's national security team will be dominated by appointees who favored the Iraq invasion... 'It's astonishing that not one of the 23 senators or 133 House members who voted against the war is in the mix,' said Sam Husseini of the liberal group Institute for Public Accuracy."

National defense
Secretary of Defense Robert Gates, who was retained in the Obama Administration, outlined an agenda for reform of the Department of Defense. His ideas centered on a perceived need to shift purchasing priorities away from costly high tech weapons, and toward lower cost alternatives that are more appropriate for the wars the U.S. was currently fighting, as well as those he believed might lie in the immediate future. He noted that there are limits to U.S. military power, and believed that the emphasis should be shifted away from fighting, and toward training, advising and equipping allied forces to fight.

Specific areas Gates and Obama agreed on were said to include:
Improved coordination and cooperation between the military and the State Department, as well as other civilian agencies.
Improving the "security capacity" of US allies to allow them to increase their participation in the War on Terrorism.
Being attentive to the risk from conventional military forces, as well as insurgencies.
Shifting troops and other resources from Iraq to Afghanistan.
Continued expansion of the Army and Marine Corps.
Overhaul of the Pentagon's procurement system.

Energy policy
Obama made energy policy one of his topmost priorities in his 2008 campaign. Towards his energy goals of United States energy independence through investment in alternative energy production he has set the following objectives:
 Within ten years save more oil than current imports from the Middle East and Venezuela combined.
By 2015 put one million plug-in hybrid vehicles on the road.
By 2012, 10% of U.S. electricity shall come from renewable sources and 25% by 2025.
By 2050, 80% of currently emitted greenhouse gases shall be eliminated.

To achieve these objectives, Obama proposed the following measures

Over 10 years invest $150 billion for energy development with a lower  emissions including:
Transition to a digital electricity grid. Create a Grid Modernization Commission to facilitate adoption of smart grid practices.
Accelerate commercialization of plug-in hybrid technology.
Create 5 million green collar jobs involved in projects such as in construction, retrofitting buildings to make them more energy efficient or to generate their own power.
Develop and deploy clean coal technology.
Establish a national low-carbon fuel standard.
Weatherize one million homes annually.
Increase "CAFE" fuel efficiency standards for vehicles.
Set construction of the Alaska natural gas pipeline as a high priority.
Establish a "use it or lose it" approach to existing oil and gas leases granted for federal land.
Establish an economy-wide cap and trade program.

Appointees recruited by Obama with experience on energy policy included Peter Orszag, an expert on cap and trade programs, who was named as director of the Office of Management and Budget. John Podesta, transition chief, was an early advocate of Detroit's refocus on using lower carbon alternatives to gasoline.

Secret Service preparations

The Secret Service, of the U.S. Department of Homeland Security, was the lead agency for both security and logistics for the Inaugural Ceremony. Their plan was to open the event to as many spectators as possible. Security was expected to be strict, and vast portions of downtown Washington would be closed to all traffic. Initially, it was thought that up to 4 million people would descend upon the area of the National Mall, but later reports from the Secret Service suggested that the number might not be that high. Arrangements for 8000 police officers were made, however, and parking for up to 10,000 tour buses was arranged. A Metro spokesperson warned that the subway system "will be utterly overwhelmed." Camping was not permitted on the mall.

On November 13, 2008, the Secret Service announced that Obama's codename would be "Renegade". In addition, his wife's is "Renaissance" and his daughters' are "Rosebud" and "Radiance".

Residential transition

The first family visited both Sidwell Friends School and Georgetown Day School before deciding on Sidwell. The residential transition began with the first of two interim stops at the Hay-Adams Hotel on January 4. The second interim stop was a move to Blair House on January 15, the traditional interim move date for Presidents-elect. The residential transition began earlier than for most incoming Presidents because the daughters began school at Sidwell on January 5. During the campaign, Michelle Obama had stated that the residential transition would be planned to be as unified as possible for all members of the family. Michelle's mother, Marian Robinson, made plans to move into the White House to assist with child care. In the current real estate market, the Obamas did not intend to sell their South Side Chicago home that sits on the border between the Hyde Park and Kenwood community areas.

Jenna and Barbara Bush had much advice for Malia and Sasha Obama. The Bush twins sent the Obama daughters an open letter that was published in The Wall Street Journal.

The outgoing Bush family did not take much with them as they left the White House. Among the items they left behind was their official state china service, a Lenox gilt-edged style with a green basket weave border, estimated to be worth $492,798. However, what they did not take with them can be included in the collection of the Presidential Library.

Vice President Dick Cheney was injured moving out of his residence just before the inauguration and used a wheelchair during the ceremony.

Assessment of the transition
Experts have given the transition high praise. Numerous experts have referred to the transition between Bush and Obama as the "gold standard" for presidential transitions. Both the Bush and Obama ends of the transition have been praised.

The transition has been praised as "seamless", in part, for its adherence to Obama's insistence that there be "one president at a time", with Obama largely avoiding giving comment during the transition on matters Bush was handling, such as the ongoing financial crisis.

See also

Barack Obama 2008 presidential campaign
Barack Obama election victory speech 2008
First inauguration of Barack Obama

Notes

Further reading

 (Initial likely appointments to the transition team.)

 (Pre-election meeting of the Obama transition team.)

External links

Presidential Transition Resource official General Services Administration (GSA)/National Archives and Records Administration (NARA) website
Change.gov archive of the Obama-Biden presidential transition project
Obama's Presidency from BBC News
The Obama Transition from the Financial Times
Lost in Transition from the National Journal
The Presidential Transition from the IBM Center for the Business of Government
The New Team from The New York Times'', profiles of potential members of the Obama administration
HLS and the new administration: Whom will Obama choose? from the Harvard Law Record, November 13, 2008
Joint Session of the 111th Congress for the purpose of certifying the Electoral College ballot count, January 9, 2009 (C-Span video)

November 2008 events in the United States
December 2008 events in the United States
January 2009 events in the United States
Barack Obama 2008 presidential campaign
Presidential transition, Obama
Obama
John Podesta
Presidential transition, Obama
Presidential transition, Obama